Arthrochilus latipes, commonly known as robust elbow orchid, is a flowering plant in the orchid family (Orchidaceae) and is endemic to the "Top End" of the Northern Territory in Australia. Each plant has from two to four ground-hugging leaves and between three and fifteen flowers during the wet season and the species often forms spreading colonies on sandstone escarpments. Like others in the genus, the flowers are pollinated by a species of thynnid wasp.

Description
Arthrochilus latipes is a terrestrial, perennial, deciduous, sympodial herb with an underground tuber which produces daughter tubers on the end of root-like stolons.

The labellum is about  but wider at the base, greenish with a dark purple blotch at its base. The callus resembles a flightless female thynnid wasp and is covered with short, shiny, club-shaped, yellowish brown to brown structures called "calli". The tip of the callus is bulb-shaped and covered with shiny black glands. One pair of column wings are triangular and point forwards, while the other pair on the side of the column are erect and have a hooked summit.

Taxonomy and naming
Arthrochilus latipes was first formally described in 1991 by David Jones and the description was published in Australian Orchid Research from a specimen collected in Radon Gorge in Kakadu National Park. The specific epithet (latipes) is derived from the Latin words latus meaning "broad" and pes meaning "foot" referring to the broad base of the labellum of this orchid species.

Distribution and habitat
Robust elbow orchid is found in the Top End of the Northern Territory, east of Darwin, growing on rocky outcrops and sandstone escarpments, especially in the Kakadu and Litchfield National Parks.

Ecology
As with other Arthrochilus orchids, robust elbow orchid is pollinated by males thynnid wasps of the genus Arthrothynnus although the species involved is not known. It also reproduces asexually by producing new tubers.

References 

latipes
Plants described in 1991
Orchids of the Northern Territory